Levi Hummon is an American country musician. Hummon is the son of country musician Marcus Hummon. Levi Hummon released his first self-titled EP in 2016. In 2018, he released his second EP titled Patient. Hummon has opened for country music artists Tim McGraw, Keith Urban, and Lady Antebellum and performed multiple shows at the Grand Ole Opry. In 2019, he launched his first headlining tour, the Drop of Us Tour with 16 tour dates across the United States. In 2019, he released his single, "State I'm In." 

In 2019, Hummon was named the face of Amazon Music's official Introducing: Country playlist along with the cover of Spotify’s Hot Country playlist. He opened for Hunter Hayes on the Closer to You Tour.

Discography

Extended plays

Singles

As lead artist

As featured artist

References

Living people
Year of birth missing (living people)
American country musicians